Martin Barnes may refer to:

Martin G. Barnes, New Jersey politician
Martin Barnes (engineer), engineer and project manager